Posi, POSI, or did  can refer to:

Engineering
 Pozidriv, a type of screw head and screwdriver
 Positraction, or any kind of limited slip differential gear

Music
 Posi music, or positive music, a motivational and inspiring music genre
 Positive hardcore, a subgenre of hardcore punk

Medicine
 The "position of safe immobilization" used when immobilizing a hand with a splint or cast

Other
 Posi, Nigeria, a settlement in Badagry Division, Lagos State in Nigeria
 Posi or Pusai, a Christian martyr

See also
 Positive (disambiguation)